Giant Sea Wall Jakarta is part of a massive coastal development project in Jakarta, Indonesia which commenced in 2014 and expected to be materialized by 2027. The coastal development project includes the construction of a giant seawall along the coast, building a water reservoir, and the reclamation of land. Construction of an 8 km part of the sea wall along the coast was officially launched on Oct. 9, 2014.

Floods in Jakarta are chronic, especially during the monsoon season. In 2007, the city suffered from catastrophic flooding that resulted in 76 deaths and half a million flood victims displaced or otherwise impacted. Jakarta lies on a low flat basin 23 feet (7 m) above sea level. 40 percent of that, particularly the northern areas, is below sea level. Given the continuous groundwater extraction and the pressure of skyscraper developments, Jakarta is sinking at 5 to 10 centimeters per year, up to 20 centimeters. From 2000 to 2050 the potential coastal flood extent is estimated to increase by 110.5 km2 due to both land subsidence and sea level rise; it is estimated that the city will be entirely submerged by 2050. Furthermore, it is estimated that the city's population of over 10.6 million people will be displaced, especially those communities closest to water bodies. 

To prevent this, a feasibility study to build a dike on Jakarta Bay was undertaken.  The project is known as National Capital Integrated Coastal Development (NCICD) master plan or Giant Sea Wall Jakarta. The project, which also has the task of revitalizing the coastline and most importantly offering a vision of the future for the Indonesian capital, was designed by the architecture firm KuiperCompagnons of Rotterdam and with a collaboration between Indonesia, and a consortium of Dutch companies (Witteveen+Bosa and Grontmij), which formed National Capital Integrated Coastal Development and were all involved in the creation of the master plan that started in 2008.

NCICD main plan
The National Capital Integrated Coastal Development ( NCICD) includes the construction of a giant sea wall just north of the bay in Jakarta as a measure to protect the city against floods from sea. Inside this wall large lagoons will be constructed to buffer outflow from the 13 rivers in Jakarta. This giant sea wall will be built in the form of a Garuda (the large mythical bird which is Indonesia's national symbol) and expected to become an iconic structure modelled after Singapore's Sentosa Island. It will take 10 to 15 years before construction of this wall is realized. Existing dikes will be strengthened in between the times. After completion of the project, Jakarta Bay would become a water reservoir enclosed in the Giant Sea Wall and would eventually become a source for clean water for the entire city. Cost of the project is estimated about US$ 40 billion, and will be an international collaboration between the governments of Indonesia and the Netherlands, paving the way for further bilateral trade between the two countries. Two phases of this mega-project are:
Strengthening and enhancing the existing coastal dikes along 30 kilometers, and construction of 17 artificial islands in the bay of Jakarta. The groundbreaking of this first phase was conducted in October 2014.
Building the Giant Sea Wall; this will be a giant dike (32 kilometers-wide) that includes an airport, harbor, toll road, residential area, industrial area, waste treatment, water reservoir, and green areas, on a space of about 4000 hectares. 

The giant sea wall will also become a center of urban development, which will be built by private partnership investments. Urban development includes upmarket offices and housing as well as low-cost housing, green areas and beaches. The new integrated waterfront city will also involve 17 artificial islands, complete with toll roads, a railway, and seaport, and should be able to absorb approximately two million people. The length of the giant sea wall may reach 32 kilometers from Tangerang to Port of Tanjung Priok.

Controversy
The project is not without negative environmental impacts and social consequences: one study by the Ministry of Maritime Affairs and Fisheries of Indonesia found that the project, once underway, could erode the islands in the western part of the bay of Jakarta, destroy the coral reef and lead to the stagnation of polluted water behind the sea wall. The possibility of this last point is rejected by the Dutch experts who, on the contrary, assure that because the city’s water will be treated, the rivers will dump clean water into the bay.
The reclamation program was also met with opposition from several environmental groups and fisher-folk. Indonesian Forum for Environment (WALHI) and the People’s Coalition for Fisheries Justice Indonesia (Kiara) submitted an appeal to halt construction work on Islet G, one of 17 islets to be created but the Supreme Court rejected the appeal. Construction work on the Jakarta reclamation project  was temporarily banned by central government in 2016 asking for the fulfillment of several requirements. However the ban was lifted in October 2017. If the great seawalls fail to shut out seawater or the project is suspended or postponed due to economic turmoil, engineering difficulties, environmental impact, or political decisions, and assuming that efforts to reduce land subsidence are not carried out, downtown Jakarta would eventually become submerged.

Critics of the project have also argued that while investors and the government will be footing the cost of the project, it is Jakarta's people that will be paying the price of this infrastructure. While the state has implied that the poor ultimately stand to gain from these projects, the reality is that Jakarta’s poor are the most negatively impacted. In 2010, Jakarta’s City Government voiced concerns over the effect of climate change over the city’s poor and promised to reduce their vulnerability to climate shocks. However, when it came time to expand Jakarta’s current sea wall as part of the Sea Wall project, many kampung settlements (i.e. informal slums) were cleared and their residents forcibly evicted. Those communities are some of the Jakarta’s poorest and most vulnerable and were unable to relocate to more permanent inland estates. Further, many of these residents relied on their proximity to the sea and their community to earn a living; their lives were unequivocally changed when they were displaced.

See also
Flooding in Jakarta
2007 Jakarta flood
Jakarta Flood Canal
Climate change in Indonesia

References

Landforms of Jakarta
Flood control in Indonesia
Flood control projects
North Jakarta
 
Seawalls
Environmental issues with water
Water in Jakarta
Climate change adaptation
Climate change in Indonesia